R. Simuna (or Semona, or Simona,, read as Rav Simuna; Alternative Hebrew spelling: רב סמוניה, רב סמונא, רב סימוניא, רב סמוניא) was a Jewish Savora sage of the second generation  of the Savora era. He headed the Pumbedita Yeshiva parallelly to Rav Ena running the Sura academy, and both committed the Talmud to writing. Some scholars identify him with Rav Giza (רב גיזא). Died in year 540 ( ד'ש'; Hebrew calendar).

References

Rabbis of Academy of Pumbedita
Savoraim